Senator O'Connell may refer to:

David O'Connell (politician) (born 1940), North Dakota State Senate
Frank O'Connell (1923–2004), Pennsylvania State Senate
Jack O'Connell (American politician) (born 1951), California State Senate